The Kennesaw State Owls men's basketball team represents Kennesaw State University in Kennesaw, Georgia, United States. The school's team currently competes in the ASUN Conference. They are currently led by head coach Amir Abdur-Rahim and play their home games at the KSU Convocation Center. 

During their time as a member of NCAA Division II, they were national champions in 2004. In 2023, they will make their first ever appearance in the NCAA Division I tournament after winning their first ASUN championship.

Former four-year graduate guard Markeith Cummings (2009–13) is the team's all-time leading scorer with 2,048 career points, passing former leader Herman Smith (1986–90, 1,683 points) on November 18, 2012.

Postseason

NCAA Division I Tournament
The Owls have made one appearance in the NCAA Division I Tournament.  The Owls were ranked as a 14th seed and lost to 3-seed Xavier in the first round.  The game was played in Greensboro, NC on Friday, March 17, 2023.

NCAA Division II Tournament results
The Owls have appeared in three NCAA Division II Tournaments. Their record is 7–2. They were national champions in 2004.

NAIA Division I Tournament results 
In their time in NAIA, the Owls appeared in one NAIA Division I Tournament. Their combined record was 0–1.

References

External links 
 Website